Márk Jagodics (born 10 April 1992) is a Hungarian football player who plays for Budafok.

Club statistics

Updated to games played as of 15 May 2021.

References 
HLSZ
MLSZ

1992 births
Living people
Sportspeople from Szombathely
Hungarian footballers
Hungary under-21 international footballers
Association football defenders
Szombathelyi Haladás footballers
FC Ajka players
Mezőkövesdi SE footballers
Budafoki LC footballers
Nemzeti Bajnokság I players
Nemzeti Bajnokság II players
21st-century Hungarian people